Quevedo or the Monument to Quevedo is an instance of public art in Madrid, Spain. A work by Agustín Querol, it is dedicated to Francisco de Quevedo, distinguished writer of the Baroque era.

History and description 

The standing Carrara marble statue representing Quevedo is featured on the top of the monument. He is wearing his staple Pince-nez (called quevedos in Spanish after him) and the cross of Saint James on his chest. Four allegorical sculptures representing Satyre, Poetry, Prose and History embrace the limestone plinth. 

A fountain made of granite from Badajoz was installed on the base of the monument in 1999.

In popular culture 
"A don Francisco de Quevedo, en piedra"—a poem authored by José Ángel Valente part of Poemas a Lázaro—is dedicated to the statue.

References 
Citations

Bibliography
 
 
 
 

Monuments and memorials in Madrid
Outdoor sculptures in Madrid
Sculptures of men in Spain
Quevedo
Buildings and structures in Trafalgar neighborhood, Madrid
1900 sculptures
Statues of writers
Stone sculptures in Spain